This is a list of Turkish football transfers for the 2008–09 season. Only moves from and/or to the Süper Lig are listed.

Summer transfer window

May
According to Transfer Dosyasi at

June
According to Transfer Dosyasi

July
According to Transfer Dosyasi

August
According to Transfer Dosyasi

Winter transfer window

January
According to Transfer Dosyasi

References

External links
NTVspor
Mackolik
Turkish Football Federation
Futbolig
Sporx

Turkey
Transfers
2008–09
Turkey